Siniša Peša (Serbian Cyrillic: Синиша Пеша; born 6 March 1973) is a retired Serbian athlete who specialised in the 400 metres hurdles. He represented his country at the 2000 Summer Olympics, as well as at two outdoor and two indoor World Championships.

Competition record

Personal bests
Outdoor
400 metres – 46.44 (Belgrade 1998)
400 metres hurdles – 49.98 (Niš 1999)
Indoor
400 metres – 47.17 (Pireás 1999)

References

All-Athletics profile

1973 births
Living people
Serbian male hurdlers
Serbia and Montenegro athletes
Serbia and Montenegro sportsmen
Olympic athletes of Yugoslavia
Athletes (track and field) at the 2000 Summer Olympics
World Athletics Championships athletes for Yugoslavia
Athletes (track and field) at the 1997 Mediterranean Games
Yugoslav male hurdlers
Mediterranean Games competitors for Serbia and Montenegro